Bustatoun is a village on the island of North Ronaldsay, in Orkney, Scotland. The settlement is within the parish of Cross and Burness.

References

External links

Canmore - North Ronaldsay, Howmae Brae
Transceltic - North Ronaldsay, with details of Howmae Brae, at Bustatoun.

Villages in Orkney
North Ronaldsay